A senatorial election was held on November 14, 1961 in the Philippines. The two candidates of the Progressive Party, guest candidates of the Liberal Party, topped the election, while the Liberals themselves won four seats cutting the Nacionalista Party's majority to 13 seats in the 24-seat Philippine Senate.

Retiring incumbents
All incumbents defended their seats in this election.

Mid-term vacancies
Claro M. Recto (Nacionalista), died on October 2, 1960

Incumbents running elsewhere 
These ran in the middle of their Senate terms. For those losing in their respective elections, they can still return to the Senate to serve out their term, while the winners will vacate their Senate seats, then it would have been contested in a special election concurrently with the next general election.

 Gil Puyat (Nacionalista), ran for vice president and lost

Results
The Liberal Party won four seats contested in the election, while the Nacionalista Party and the Liberal Party won two each.

Lorenzo Sumulong was the sole Nacionalista to successfully defend his seat. Liberal Francisco Soc Rodrigo, who originally was a Nacionalista, was the other senator to defend his seat.

Two Liberals are neophyte senators: Gaudencio Antonino and Maria Kalaw Katigbak. Also entering the Senate for the first time are Progressives Manuel Manahan and Raul Manglapus. Camilo Osias, who last served in the Senate in 1953, won back a Senate seat as a Liberal.

Incumbent Nacionalista senators Decoroso Rosales, Domocao Alonto, Pacita Madrigal-Warns, Pedro Sabido, and Quintin Paredes all lost.

Key:
 ‡ Seats up
 + Gained by a party from another party
 √ Held by the incumbent
 * Held by the same party with a new senator
 ^ Vacancy

Per candidate

Per party

See also
Commission on Elections
5th Congress of the Philippines

References

External links
 The Philippine Presidency Project
 Official website of the Commission on Elections

1961
Senate election